was a Japanese quiz variety show on Fuji Television, airing Wednesdays from 19:00-19:57 Japan Standard Time. The show began airing on October 19, 2005, ending on September 28, 2011 with 247 episodes aired; its predecessor,  aired from June 5 through October 12, 2005.

Summary
Quiz! Hexagon II was hosted by Shinsuke Shimada and Hitomi Nakamura. Guests on the show often included Japanese owarai comedians and tarento. Since 2007, a number of music subgroups have formed that have released singles; among the most popular of these have been Shuchishin and Pabo.

During each episode, three teams (the membership of which was determined based on a paper quiz show participants took prior to each episode) competed for points in various quizzes, testing team members' knowledge on a variety of topics.

Change from Quiz! Hexagon
Due to the low ratings of the previous show "Quiz! Hexagon" (which aired from July 7, 2002 - October 10, 2005) chairman Shinsuke Shimada accepted a request for an update to the show, and beginning the following week (June 15, 2005) - with the added subtitle "This Evening is a Quiz Parade" - the show became a battle between three six-member teams. Later, Shinsuke said in an interview published in the special extra-large summer issue (August 14/21, 2008) of the magazine , "It was not the renewal season, but the producer quickly agreed. All around it was like the quick fix of a government office."

Change to Wednesdays at 19:00 JST
The official title was "Quiz! Hexagon II," but within the show in the logo and in Shinsuke's title call, it became "Hexagon II Quiz Parade!!

Recently, it has become a common occurrence for the ratings to rise in the last 10% of the show (last 20% of a special), and there have also been times when the show surpasses the competing program . Also, around the times of reorganization and in exceptional instances, the production of 2-3 hour specials has become common, but recently even in times of reorganization the production of regular shows also occurs.

On January 2, 2008, from 19:00 - 21:54 JST, it was broadcast as the replacement for the year-end special program  that had run on January 2 from 2001 to 2007 (with a New Year's show in 2005 and a special show in 2005) but had ended regular production. (The same occurred in 2009).

The show's best ratings were on September 3, 2008, when it received 23.5% in the Kantō region (Fuji TV). In the Kansai region (Kansai TV), the August 1, 2008 2-hour special had a rating of 29.6%. (According to Video Research, Ltd.)

According to the Children & Media Opinion Poll sponsored by the Japanese National PTA Convention, under the category of "Programs Parents Do Not Want to Show Their Children" it ranked 6th in 2009, having been 7th in 2008, but on the other hand it was ranked 8th in the category "Programs to Show Children."

O-baka Tarento 
Those who give strange answers are mocked as O-baka Tarento, 'Foolish celebrities'.

In the early stages of the program, people like Shin Koda, Akane Osawa, and Saki Fukuda became semi-regulars, and within the program they were dealt with as "O-baka," but beginning around the time of September 2006, when Mai Satoda became a semi-regular, the situation changed. She did not once beat the other regular guests in the preliminary test and came to monopolize the lowest ranking, and the "Obaka tarento" who had appeared to this point little by little stopped being treated as "Baka." Due to this, from all around the image of "Last Place = Satoda" became strong and it often became joke material. However, in 2007 guests at the same level or worse than Satoda - such as Takeshi Tsuruno, Yukina Kinoshita, Suzanne, Yusuke Kamiji, and Naoki Nokubo - became semi-regulars, and Satoda's monopolized status was reduced. From there, the six people - joined with Satoda - were called the "6-man Baka Group," and became featured performers on the show. In 2007, the CD debuts of the three women, as Pabo, and the three men, as Shuchishin (when together, the six-person group was called aladdin), were huge hits. Currently, they have moved from semi-regulars to become regulars, and have become popular tarento, become regulars on other shows as well.

In 2008, the popularity of misono, who was at the same level as the other six, rose when she became a semi-regular. She appeared as a guest on various shows, and the song , released in June, entered into the top 10, her first since her debut as a solo artist.

Beginning in the latter half of 2008, a number of popular performers with low test scores (referred to by Shinsuke as "High-Popularity Baka") have become semi-regulars: beginning in June 2008, Akina Minami; in October 2008, Mari Yaguchi; in 2009, Daisuke Motoki; in April 2009, Shintaro Yamada; in June 2009, Nozomi Tsuji. There are also other regularly appearing "O-baka tarento," such as former professional boxer Yoko Gushiken who has an all-time average of 4 points (out of a possible 50) in the qualifying paper test.

Program Proceedings
Prior to the beginning of the show a 50-question preliminary paper test was given to the performers. At the opening of the show the results of the preliminary paper test were announced, and based on ranking three teams were formed with an equal division of knowledge level. These three teams competed in quizzes for the purpose of attaining the cash prize, and the team with the most points at the end of all stages became the winner. (In the case that at the very end the top score was matched by multiple teams, the bottom-ranked members of those teams once more completed in a one question, one shot playoff, with the person who correctly answered the question becoming champion.)

In the early parts of 2008, there was a rule that in the case of sudden death, the quiz would take place at the pool used for the Action Quiz, but eventually as it did not reach sudden death, the action quiz was ended and not used after all.

Cancellation
The show came to an end in September 2011, after host Shinsuke Shimada was forced to retire from show business due to his connections with the Yamaguchi-gumi.

Program
Chairman: Shinsuke Shimada
On the October 22, 2008 show, he appeared under the name "Cassius Shimada," in charge of lyrics and songwriting.
Program Assistant: Hitomi Nakamura (Fuji Television Announcer)
Questioner: Toshiyuki Makihara (Fuji Television Announcer)
Additionally, the following people have been employed as question narrators: Toshihiro Ito (Fuji Television Announcer, for "Belt Quiz: Time Shock! Shock!" that occurred during the May 6, 2009 Jumprope Quiz), Tetsuo Sakaguchi (for "Quiz! First Usage" that took place March 28, 2007), Tetsuya Aoshima & Kenji Fukui (Dual Fuji Television Announcers), Hideki Yamanaka (at the time, a Fuji Television Announcer, now freelance).
Assistant: Kazuha Sakiyama (until August 2008), Ayumi, and others
Narrator: Mayumi Tanaka

Principal contestants
"Hexagon Family" is the name that has come to be used for regular participants in Hexagon.

Male participants
Shuchishin
Yusuke Kamiji
Takeshi Tsuruno
Keisuke Okada
Fujiwara (owarai duo)
Takayuki Haranishi
Toshifumi Fujimoto
Eiji Bandō
Shinagawa Shōji (owarai duo)
Hiroshi Shinagawa
Tomoharu Shōji
Yoshio Kojima
Chris Matsumura
Hiromi Sakimoto
Ungirls (owarai duo)
Yoshiaki Yamane
Takushi Tanaka
LaSalle Ishii
Daisuke Motoki
Shintarō Yamada
Masayuki Watanabe
Tetsuya Kanmuri

Female participants
Pabo
Yukina Kinoshita
Mai Satoda
Suzanne
Misono
Akina Minami
Mari Yaguchi

Former participants
Naoki Nokubo
Shin Koda
Saki Fukuda
Hidehiko Masuda
Maimi Okuwa
Taka and Toshi
Taro Yabe
Yuko Ogura
Mona Yamamoto
Kuniko Asagi
Audrey (owarai duo)
Toshiaki Kasuga
Masayasu Wakabayashi
Yuuko Mizuno
Dandy Sakano
Rika Sato
Yōku Hata
Ranko Kanbe
Nozomi Tsuji
Akane Osawa

Musical units
Since 2007, when Pabo was formed as a unit originating from the program, music units have frequently been formed - referred to as the "Hexagon Family" - and on October 22, 2008 the album "We Love Hexagon" was released. Also, since the August 1, 2007 broadcast, song announcements have been made during the ending part of the broadcast, and since March 19, 2008, various units have performed almost every time - as an ending - in the form of a live studio performance.
Pabo
Mai Satoda, Sae "Suzanne" Yamamoto, Yukina Kinoshita

Takeshi Tsuruno(Shu), Naoki Nokubo (Chi), Yusuke Kamiji (Shin)

Chris Matsumura (Rakuda), Yoshiaki Yamene (Kappa)

Pabo & Shuchishin

Misono, Hiroshi Shinagawa

Keisuke Okada (Kei), Tomoharu Shouji (Tomo), Yoku Hata (Yo), Takeshi Kongochi (Takeshi), Yoshiaki Yamene (Yoshi), Takushi Tanaka

Dandy Sakano, Yoku Hata, Yoshio Kojima, Takeshi Kongochi

Mai Satoda, Toshifumi Fujimoto (Jaian), Misono (Jaiko)
Mari Yaguchi

Tomoharu Shouji, Sae "Suzanne" Yamamoto

Toshiyuki Makihara (Manager), Hitomi Nakamura (Subordinate)

Akina Minami, Hiromi Sakimoto, Yoku Hata, Toshifumi Fujimoto, Takayuki Haranishi, Yoshio Kojima, Chris Matsumura

Mai Satoda, Toshifumi Fujimoto (Jaian), Misono (Jaiko), Ranko Kanbe (Goda Sister #2)

Takeshi Tsuruno, Hiromi Sakimoto

Keisuke Okada (Dada Suberi), Yoshio Kojima (Choi Suberi), Yoku Hata (Hata)

Mari Yaguchi, Akane Osawa, Rika Sato, Daisuke Motoki, Keisuke Okada, Takayuki Haranishi, Hiroshi Shinagawa, Yoshiaki Yamane, Chris Matsumura

Shintaro Yamada (Saataa), Takuya Matsuoka (Andaa), Kohei Mori (Gii)

Michael Masashi Murakami, Hanaka Tsukita

Hiroshi Shinagawa, Keisuke Okada (Dada Suberi), Yoshio Kojima (Choi Suberi), Yoku Hata (Hata)

Tomoharu Shouji (Queen), Yoku Hata (Joker), Yoshiaki Yamane (Ace), Takushi Tanaka (Jack), Ryoei (King)

Sae "Suzanne" Yamamoto (White Suzanne), Tetsuji Sakakibara (Black Suzanne), & Akane Osawa (Black Suzanne's singing voice)

Takeshi Tsuruno, Ryoei, Mai Satoda, misono

Discography

References

External links
 Official Website 

Japanese variety television shows
Fuji TV original programming
2005 Japanese television series debuts
2011 Japanese television series endings